Hans Kadelbach (1 October 1900 – 7 June 1979) was a German sailor who competed in the 1952 Summer Olympics.

References

1900 births
1979 deaths
German male sailors (sport)
Olympic sailors of Germany
Sailors at the 1952 Summer Olympics – 6 Metre